Luke Kennard (born 1981) is a British poet, critic, novelist and lecturer.

He won an Eric Gregory Award in 2005 for his first collection The Solex Brothers. His second collection, The Harbour Beyond The Movie, was shortlisted for the 2007 Forward Prize for Best Collection, making him the youngest ever poet to be nominated. In 2014 he was named as one of the Poetry Book Society's Next Generation Poets. His debut novel, The Transition, was published by Fourth Estate in March 2017. The novel was a BBC Radio 4 Book at Bedtime. His poetry collection Notes on the Sonnets won the 2021 Forward Prize for Best Collection.

Publications
 The Solex Brothers (2005)
 The Harbour Beyond The Movie (2007)
 The Migraine Hotel (2009)
 Planet Shaped Horse (2011)
 The Necropolis Boat (2012)
 Holophin (2012)
 A Lost Expression (2012)
 Cain (2016)
 The Transition (2017)
 Truffle Hound (2018)
 Notes on the Sonnets (2021)
 The Answer to Everything (2021)
 Bad Sermons (2021)

References

External links
Interview with Luke Kennard by The Poetry Extension

Living people
1981 births
21st-century British poets